James Arthur Francis (12 December 1910 – 16 November 2004) was an Australian rules footballer and coach in the Victorian Football League (VFL).

Family
The son of Henry Walter Francis (1883–1964) and Sarah Victoria Francis, nee Jackson (1884–1929), James Arthur Francis was born in Hawthorn on 12 December 1910. 

His brothers John and Syd also played VFL football, both for Hawthorn.

In 1937, James Francis married Shirley Louise King at St. Stephens Church of England in Richmond.

Football

Hawthorn
After playing 61 games for Hawthorn, Francis left the Hawks in controversial circumstances, due to a disagreement with the club and his family's sports store. Francis wanted the club to order their uniforms through his store, but when Hawthorn secretary Sam Ramsay refused, he asked for a clearance to Carlton.

Carlton
Francis made his debut for the Carlton Football Club in round 9 of the 1934 season. He retired as a player at the end of the 1943 season having played 162 games and was later appointed coach of the Blues from 1956 to 1958. Under his tenure the Blues struggled, despite having a good side on paper, and Francis was sacked in 1958. Francis was bitter about the firing and never spoke to his former close friend and Carlton coaching successor Ken Hands again.

St Kilda
Francis was appointed St Kilda Football Club senior coach for 1959–60, again achieving modest on-field results.

Death
Jim Francis died on 16 November 2004 and is buried at Box Hill Cemetery.

References

External links
 Jim Francis at Blueseum

St Kilda Football Club coaches
1910 births
Carlton Football Club players
Carlton Football Club Premiership players
Hawthorn Football Club players
Carlton Football Club coaches
John Nicholls Medal winners
Australian rules footballers from Melbourne
2004 deaths
One-time VFL/AFL Premiership players
People from Hawthorn, Victoria